The San Diego Film Critics Society Award for Best Adapted Screenplay is a film award given by the San Diego Film Critics Society.

Winners

1990s

2000s

2010s

2020s

References
San Diego Film Critics Society - Awards

Screenwriting awards for film